Commissioning is the process of assuring that all systems and components of a building or industrial plant are designed, installed, tested, operated, and maintained according to the operational requirements of the owner or final client.

For large projects, this process usually comprises planning, execution, and control of hundreds of thousands of inspection and test activities on “commissionable objects”, such as instruments, equipment, skids, modules, circuits, loops, subsystems, and systems. In this case, the large volume and complexity of commissioning data, and the need to guarantee information traceability, normally require the use of powerful IT tools, known as commissioning management systems or completion management systems.

Although these systems allow effective planning, management and monitoring of commissioning activities, as well as logging of all evidences necessary to the process they are not without a cost, as annual, monthly or per user license fees and can typically range from upwards of 10000 USD/year to 5 USD/day/user to unlimited use for 160 USD/month. The design of these systems can also vary greatly, from rich native applications that need to be installed on a computer to lightweight web-based systems that can be accessed from any web browser or mobile solutions that only require a smartphone to access the relevant information. Choosing one of these solutions is entirely dependent on the needs of the project and its users due to specific benefits and drawbacks from choosing either.

See also 

Project commissioning
New-construction building commissioning

References

Project management
Management systems